William Hillary Clarke (born 5 July 1933 in Toronto, Ontario) is a chartered Accountant, businessman and politician. Clarke served as a Progressive Conservative party member of the House of Commons of Canada.

He entered national politics following his victory at Vancouver Quadra riding in the 1972 federal election. Clarke was re-elected at the riding in the 1974, 1979 and 1980 federal elections.

In the 1984 federal election, Clarke was defeated by Prime Minister John Turner, leader of the Liberal Party. Clarke was defeated even as his party won the most seats in Canadian history.  Clarke made two further unsuccessful attempts to regain Vancouver Quadra in 1988 and 2000.

Clarke served four consecutive terms, from the 29th through 32nd Canadian Parliaments.

Clarke attended schools in Toronto's Forest Hill district, then studied at Ridley College at St. Catharines and St. George's School in Vancouver. His post-secondary education was at the University of British Columbia. He became a Chartered Accountant for Price Waterhouse's Vancouver office in 1956.

He was the Conservative Party of British Columbia candidate for the 2013 British Columbia general election for the riding of Vancouver-Quilchena, but did not win the riding.

Archives 
There is a Bill Clarke fonds at Library and Archives Canada. Archival reference number is R3730.

References

External links
 
 William Hillary Clarke fonds at Library and Archives Canada

1933 births
Living people
Politicians from Toronto
Canadian accountants
Canadian Anglicans
Members of the House of Commons of Canada from British Columbia
Progressive Conservative Party of Canada MPs
University of British Columbia alumni
British Columbia Conservative Party candidates in British Columbia provincial elections